Lisbeth Joanne "Libbi" Gorr (born 24 March 1965) is an Australian broadcaster working in both TV and radio. Gorr is also an author, voice artist, writer and performer. She first came to prominence with the satirical television character that she created called "Elle McFeast".

Early life 
Gorr was born in Melbourne into a Jewish Australian family   grew up in Murrumbeena and was educated at the Methodist Ladies' College. She began working in comedy while she was an arts and law student at the University of Melbourne. Gorr graduated with a Bachelor of Arts and Bachelor of Laws in 1988.  After graduation she became an articled clerk with the Melbourne law firm Phillips Fox. Gorr had her first regular media job as the voice of the Sportsgirl fashion chain when she was asked to "sound" like a photo of supermodel Elle Macpherson.

She also performed with the Hot Bagels, an all-women cabaret group.

Television
As the character Elle McFeast, Gorr performed in a number of award-winning television shows, including Andrew Denton's Live and Sweaty. She  hosted Live and Sweaty for another two years after his retirement from the show in 1993, becoming the first woman to host a Sports /comedy Tonight show in Australia.

in 1995 Libbi Gorr created McFeast: Live from the Bowels of Parliament House. This was a weekly 30 minute  political satire / comedy show. The final credits featured Gorr dancing on the desks of Australian parliamentarians to “She’s so fine”, by the Easybeats. It ran for two seasons.

As McFeast she also created 14 TV specials, including Breasts, Sex, Guys and Videotape, Portrait of a Power Pussy and the television show Elle McFeast Live. Gorr made the transition to appearing as herself on camera hosting the Marie Clare "What Women Want" forums, and the televised IF awards for film in Australia.  In 2001 a portrait of her, called "Excelle – Libbi Gorr", by painter Margarita Georgiadis, was entered in the Archibald Prize for portraiture. The painting was hung as a finalist. A photographic portrait by Petrea Hicks was also hung the following year.

In 2003 she performed a live show "Dirty Sweet Cherry on Top!" at the Sydney Opera House

In 2007 Gorr hosted the short-lived Channel Nine show The Catch Up. The program, a revised version of the American program The View, ran for only four months before being cancelled due to poor ratings. Gorr, however, received positive reviews.

Gorr has contributed to Studio 10 on Network Ten as a studio panellist and Melbourne correspondent.

In 2016, Gorr began presenting stories as a guest reporter for the ABC flagship current affairs program 7.30.

Radio and journalism

In January 2012, Gorr joined ABC Radio Melbourne as host of the Sunday morning program. She also regularly hosted Breakfast when Red Symons was the main presenter and on leave.

In December 2021, Gorr announced her resignation from ABC Radio Melbourne to pursue her creative interests. Her last show on ABC Radio Melbourne was on 19 December 2021.

Books 
Gorr has authored two books for Harper Collins, The A–Z of Mummy Manners: An Etiquette Guide for Managing Other Children's Mothers and Assorted Mummy Dilemmas (2011) and The Bedtime Poem For Edible Children illustrated by Bradley Trevor Greive (2012).

Personal life
Gorr's partner is freelance producer and director Stewart Burchmore (brother of actor Rhonda Burchmore). They have two children and live in Melbourne.

References

External links
 
 774 ABC Melbourne: Libbi Gorr profile

1965 births
Australian women comedians
Australian Jews
Australian television actresses
Australian television personalities
Women television personalities
Journalists from Melbourne
Actresses from Melbourne
Jewish Australian writers
Jewish Australian actresses
Jewish Australian comedians
People educated at Methodist Ladies' College, Melbourne
University of Melbourne women
People from Murrumbeena, Victoria
Australian women radio presenters
Radio personalities from Melbourne
Living people